Glass jaw may refer to:

 a fighter with limited ability to absorb punishment to the chin or jaw
 Glass Jaw (aka Lasileuka), a 2004 Finnish short drama film directed by Zaida Bergroth
 Glassjaw, an American rock band